Writing genres (more commonly known as literary genres) are categories that distinguish literature (including works of prose, poetry, drama, hybrid forms, etc.) based on some set of stylistic criteria. Sharing literary conventions, they typically consist of similarities in theme/topic, style, tropes, and storytelling devices; common settings and character types; and/or formulaic patterns of character interactions and events, and an overall predictable form.

A literary genre may fall under either one of two categories: (a) a work of fiction, involving non-factual descriptions and events invented by the author; or (b) a work of nonfiction, in which descriptions and events are understood to be factual. In literature, a work of fiction can refer to a short story, novella, and novel, the latter being the longest form of literary prose. Every work of fiction falls into a literary subgenre, each with its own style, tone, and storytelling devices.

Moreover, these genres are formed by shared literary conventions that change over time as new genres emerge while others fade. Accordingly, they are often defined by the cultural expectations and needs of a particular historical and, cultural moment or place.

According to Alastair Fowler, the following elements can be used to define genres: organizational features (chapters, acts, scenes, stanzas); length; mood; style; the reader's role (e.g., in mystery works, readers are expected to interpret evidence); and the author's reason for writing (an epithalamion is a poem composed for marriage).

History
Genres are formed shared literary conventions that change over time as new genres emerge while others fade. As such, genres are not wholly fixed categories of writing; rather, their content evolves according to social and cultural contexts and contemporary questions of morals and norms.

The most enduring genres are those literary forms that were defined and performed by the Ancient Greeks; definitions sharpened by the proscriptions of modern civilization's earliest literary critics and rhetorical scholars, such as Plato, Aristotle, Socrates, Aeschylus, Aspasia, Euripides, and others. The prevailing genres of literary composition in Ancient Greece were all written and constructed to explore cultural, moral, or ethical questions; they were ultimately defined as the genres of epic, tragedy, and comedy. Aristotle's proscriptive analysis of tragedy, for example, as expressed in his Rhetoric and Poetics, saw it as having 6 parts (music, diction, plot, character, thought, and spectacle) working together in particular ways. Thus, Aristotle established one of the earliest delineations of the elements that define genre.

Fiction genres 

 Children's
 Classic (or literary fiction): works with artistic/literary merit that are typically character-driven rather than plot-driven, following a character's inner story. They often include political criticism, social commentary, and reflections on humanity. These works are part of an accepted literary canon and widely taught in schools.
 Coming-of-age
 Bildungsroman: works that focus on the psychological and moral growth of a character from youth into adulthood.
 Epic: a narrative defined by heroic or legendary adventures presented in a long format.
 Epic poetry: narrative poetry about extraordinary feats occurring in a time before history, involving religious underpinnings and themes.
 Fabulation:  A class composed mostly of 20th-century novels that are in a style similar to magical realism, and do not fit into the traditional categories of realism.
 Folklore (folktale)
 Animal tale
 Fable: short story that anthropomorphizes non-humans in order to illustrate a moral lesson
 Fairy tale
 Ghost story
 Legend: story, sometimes of a national or folk hero, that has a basis in fact but also includes imaginative material
 Myth: traditional narrative, often based in part on historical events, that reveals human behavior and natural phenomena by its symbolism; often pertaining to the actions of the gods.
 Parable
 Personal narrative
 Urban legend
 Historical: works that take place in the past—which can be real, imagined, or a combination of both. Many such works involve actual historical figures or historical events within historical settings.
 Alternate history: fiction in which one or more historical events occur differently than how they transpired in reality. Example: The Man in the High Castle (1962).
 Historical fantasy
 Historical mystery
 Historical romance
 Regency romance
 Nautical fiction
 Pirate novel
 Meta (aka romantic irony in the context of Romantic literature): uses self-reference to draw attention to itself as a work of art while exposing the "truth" of a story.
 Metaparody
 Nonsense
 Nonsense verse
 Paranoid
 Philosophical
 Pop culture: fiction written with the intention of being filled with references from other works and media. Stories in this genre focused solely on using pop culture references.
 Realist: works that are set in a time and place that are true to life (i.e. that could actually happen in the real world), abiding by real-world laws of nature. They depict real people, places, and stories in order to be as truthful as possible.
 Religious or inspirational
 Christian
 Islamic
 Theological: fiction that explores the theological ideas that shape attitudes towards religious expression.
 Visionary
 Satire: usually fiction and less frequently in non-fiction, in which vices, follies, abuses, and shortcomings are held up to ridicule, with the intent of shaming individuals, corporations, government, or society itself into improvement.
 Horatian
 Juvenalian
 Menippean
 Social and political fiction
 Libertarian sci-fi
 Social sci-fi
 Political thriller
 Thriller (or suspense): typically dark and suspenseful plot-driven fiction involving a person or group facing imminent harm, and the attempts made to evade that harm. Thrillers regularly use plot twists, red herrings, and cliffhangers, and seldom include comedic elements.
 Conspiracy
 Erotic
 Legal
 Financial
 Political
 Psychological
 Romantic suspense
 Techno-thriller
 Urban: fiction set in an urban environment.
 Western: works that follow cowboys, settlers, and outlaws exploring the American frontier and Old West, typically in the late-19th to early-20th century.
 Florida
 Northern
 Space
 Western romance
 Weird West
 Young adult

Action and adventure 
Action fiction and adventure fiction. The hero's journey is the most popular narrative structure of an adventure novel.

 Adventure fantasy
 Heroic fantasy
 Lost world
 Sword-and-sandal
 Sword-and-sorcery
 Sword-and-soul
 Wuxia
 Nautical
 Pirate
 Robinsonade
 Spy: fiction involving espionage and establishment of modern intelligence agencies.
 Spy-Fi: spy fiction that includes elements of science fiction.
 Subterranean
 Superhero
 Survival
 Picaresque
 Swashbuckler: fiction based on a time of swordsmen, pirates and ships, and other related ideas, usually full of action.

Comedy 
Comedy (including comic novel, light poetry, and comedic journalism): usually a fiction full of fun, fancy, and excitement, meant to entertain and sometimes cause intended laughter; but can be contained in all genres.
 Burlesque
 Fantasy
 Comedy horror
 Parody
 Metaparody
 Sci-fi
 Surreal comedy
 Tall tale: humorous story with blatant exaggerations, such as swaggering heroes who do the impossible with nonchalance.
 Tragicomedy: a work containing elements of both comedy and tragedy.

Crime and mystery 
Crime fiction (including crime comics) centers on a crime(s), how the criminal gets caught and serves time, and the repercussions of the crime

 Caper: fiction told from the point of view of the criminals rather than the investigator. Well-known writers in this genre include W. R. Burnett, John Boland, Peter O’Donnell, and Michael Crichton.
 Giallo
 Legal thriller
 Mystery: fiction that follows a crime (e.g., a murder, a disappearance) as it is committed, investigated, and solved, as well as providing clues and revealing information/secrets as the story unfolds.
 Cozy mystery: mystery fiction that contain no sex, violence, or profanity. Well-known writers in this genre include Dorothy L. Sayers and Elizabeth Daly.
 City mysteries
 Detective: fiction that follows a detective or other investigator (professional, amateur, or retired) as they investigate or solve a mystery/crime. Detective novels generally begin with a mysterious incident (e.g., death). One of the most popular examples is the Sherlock Holmes stories; well-known detective novelists include Agatha Christie and Raymond Chandler.
 Gong'an
 Girl detective
 Inverted detective story (aka howcatchem)
 Occult detective
 Hardboiled
 Historical mystery
 Locked-room mystery
 Police procedural: mystery fiction that feature a protagonist who is a member of the police force. Well-known novelists in this genre include Ed McBain, P. D. James, and Bartholomew Gill.
 Whodunit: mystery fiction that focuses on the puzzle regarding who committed the crime.
 Noir
 Nordic noir
 Tart Noir

Speculative fiction

Fantasy 
Fantasy (including comics and magazines) is a speculative fiction that use imaginary characters set in fictional universes inspired by mythology and folklore, often including magical elements, magical creatures, or the supernatural. Examples: Alice’s Adventures in Wonderland (1885) and the Harry Potter books.

 Action-adventure 
 Heroic
 Lost world
 Subterranean
 Sword-and-sandal
 Sword-and-sorcery
 Wuxia
 Fantasy comedy 
 Bangsian
 Contemporary
 Occult detective fiction
 Paranormal romance
 Urban
 Dark or Gothic
 Cozy fantasy
 Fairytale
 Fantastique
 Fantasy of manners
 Gaslamp
 Grimdark
 Gritty
 Hard
 High
 Historical
 Isekai
 Juvenile
 Low
 Magic realism: normal in the world in which the story takes place.
 Mythic: fiction that is rooted in, inspired by, or that in some way draws from the tropes, themes, and symbolism of myth, legend, folklore, and fairy tales.
 Mythopoeia: fiction in which characters from religious mythology, traditional myths, folklore, and/or history are recast into a re-imagined realm created by the author.
 Mythpunk
 Romantic
 Science: science fiction based in elements of fantasy.
 Dying Earth
 Planetary romance
 Sword and planet
 Superhero
 Supernatural
 Shenmo
 Weird fiction 
 New weird
 Weird West

Horror 
Horror (including comics and magazines) involves fiction in which plot and characters are tools used to elicit a feeling of dread and terror, as well as events that often evoke fear in both the characters and the reader. Horrors generally focus on themes of death, demons, evil spirits, and the afterlife.

 Body (aka biological): intentionally showcases grotesque or psychologically disturbing violations of the human body (including organ transplantation). Example: Frankenstein (1818).
 Comedy 
 Zombie comedy
 Erotic (sometimes monster erotica)
 Ero guro
 Ghost stories and ghostlore
 Gothic (aka gothic romanticism; and dark romanticism): fiction mixing themes of horror, romance, and death
 American
 Southern
 Southern Ontario
 Space
 Suburban
 Tasmanian
 Urban
 Japanese
 Korean
 Lovecraftian (or Cosmic)
 Monster literature
 Jiangshi fiction
 Werewolf fiction
 Vampire literature
 Psychological
 Splatterpunk
 Techno
 Weird fiction
 Weird menace
 Weird West
 Zombie apocalypse

Science fiction 
Science fiction (including comics, magazines, novels, and short stories) is speculative fiction with imagined elements that are inspired by natural sciences (physics, chemistry, astronomy, etc.) or social sciences (psychology, anthropology, sociology, etc.). Common elements of this genre include time travel, space exploration, and futuristic societies. (Sci-fi was originally regarded as scientific romance.)

 Apocalyptic and post-apocalyptic
 Christian
 Comedy
 Utopian and dystopian
 Dystopian: fiction set in a society that the author views as being worse than the one in which they live in at the time of writing. Example: Brave New World (1932) and Fahrenheit 451 (1953).
 Cyberpunk: juxtaposes advanced technology with less-advanced, broken down society. Derivatives of cyberpunk include: 
 Biopunk
 Dieselpunk
 Japanese cyberpunk
 Nanopunk
 Solarpunk
 Steampunk: blends technology with steam-powered machinery.
 Utopian: (often satirical) fiction set in a utopia; a community or society that possesses highly desirable or perfect qualities.
 Feminist
 Gothic
 Isekai
 Hard
 Climate fiction
 Parallel world
 Libertarian
 Mecha
 Mecha anime and manga
 Military
 Soft
 Anthropological
 Social
 Science fantasy: sci-fi inspired by mythology and folklore, often including elements of magic.
 Dying Earth 
 Planetary romance
 Sword and planet
 Space opera: fiction that take place in outer space and center around conflict, romance, and adventure.
 Space Western: fiction that blends elements of sci-fi with those of the western genre.
 Spy-Fi: spy fiction that includes elements of science fiction
 Subterranean
 Superhero
 Tech noir
 Techno-thriller

Romance 
Romantic fiction is those which give primary focus around a love story between two people, usually having an "emotionally satisfying and optimistic ending." Also Romance (literary fiction) – works that frequently, but not exclusively, takes the form of the historical romance.

 Amish
 Chivalric
 Fantasy: One example is The Princess Bride.
 Contemporary
 Gay
 Lesbian
 Medical
 Erotic
 Thriller
 Romantic fantasy
 Historical
 Regency
 Inspirational: combines explicitly Christian themes with the development of a romantic relationship.
 Paranormal
 Time-travel
 Romantic suspense
 Western
 Young Adult

Nonfiction genres 

 Academic
 Literature review: a summary and careful comparison of previous academic work published on a specific topic
 Research article or research paper
 Scientific: scholarly publication reporting original empirical and theoretical work in the natural or social sciences.
 Technical report
 Textbook: authoritative and detailed factual description of a thing
 Thesis (or dissertation): a document submitted in support of candidature for an academic degree or professional qualification presenting the author's research and findings.
 Bibliography: an organized listing of books or writings
 Annotated bibliography: a bibliography that provides a summary for each of its entries.
 Biography: a written narrative of a person's life; an autobiography is a self-written biography.
 Memoir: a biographical account of a particular event or period in a person's life (rather than their whole life) drawn from personal knowledge or special sources (such as the spouse of the subject).
 Misery literature
 Slave narrative
 Contemporary
Neo
 Cookbook: a kitchen reference containing recipes.
 Creative nonfiction: factual narrative presented in the form of a story so as to entertain the reader.
 Personal narrative: a prose relating personal experience and opinion to a factual narrative.
 Essay: a short literary composition, often reflecting the author's outlook or point of view.
 Position paper
 Journalistic writing: reporting on news and current events
 Arts
 Business
 Data-driven
 Entertainment
 Environmental
 Fashion
 Global
 Medical
 Political
 Science
 Sports
 Technical
 Trade
 Video games
 World
 Reference work: publication that one can refer to for confirmed facts, such as a dictionary, thesaurus, encyclopedia, almanac, or atlas.
 Self-help: a work written with information intended to instruct or guide readers on solving personal problems.
 Obituary
 Travel: literature containing elements of the outdoors, nature, adventure, and traveling.
 Guide book: book of information about a place, designed for the use of visitors or tourists
 Travel blog
 True crime

Literary fiction vs. genre fiction
Literary fiction is a term used to distinguish certain fictional works that possess commonly held qualities to readers outside genre fiction. Literary fiction has been defined as any fiction that attempts to engage with one or more truths or questions, hence relevant to a broad scope of humanity as a form of expression. Genre fiction is a term used to distinguish fictional works written with the intent of fitting into a specific literary genre, in order to appeal to readers and fans already familiar with that genre. There are many sources that help readers find and define literary fiction and genre fiction.

Academic novel (aka campus novel)
School story
Varsity novel
 Adventure fiction
 Echtra - pre-Christian Old Irish literature about a hero's adventures in the Otherworld or with otherworldly beings.
Lost world
Nautical fiction
Picaresque novel – depicts the adventures of a roguish, but "appealing hero", of low social class, who lives by his wits in a corrupt society.
 Robinsonade – a "castaway narrative".
Subterranean fiction
Apocalyptic literature - details the authors' visions of the end times as revealed by an angel or other heavenly messenger.
Bildungsroman - "coming of age" story. The German word "Bildung" can mean both "education" and "self-development."
 Crime fiction
 Campus murder mystery
 Historical fiction
Biographical novel
Historical romance
Historical mystery
Neo-slave narrative
Plantation tradition
Regency novel
 Literary nonsense
 Nonsense verse
Mathematical fiction
Nonfiction novel
 Novel of manners
Regency romance
Occupational fiction
 Legal thriller
Musical fiction
Sports fiction
 Romance novel
Medical romance
Political fiction
 Speculative fiction
 Science fiction
Quantum fiction
Prehistoric fiction
 Travel literature
Imaginary voyage
 Immram – Old Irish tales concerning a hero's sea journey to the Otherworld
Milesian tale – a travelogue told from memory by a narrator who every now and then would relate how he encountered other characters who told him stories which he would then incorporate into the main tale.
Religious fiction
Christian fiction
Christian science fiction
Contemporary Christian fiction
Islamic fiction
Jewish fiction
Saga
Family saga
Speculative fiction
Fantasy
By setting
Epic / high fantasy
Hard fantasy
Historical fantasy
Prehistoric fantasy
Medieval fantasy
Wuxia
Low fantasy
Urban fantasy
Paranormal romance
By theme
Comic fantasy
Contemporary fantasy
Dark fantasy
Fantasy of manners
Heroic fantasy
Magic realism
Mythic
Paranormal fantasy
Shenmo fantasy
Superhero fantasy
Sword and sorcery
Horror
Body horror
Splatterpunk
Erotic
Gothic fiction
Southern Gothic
Psychological
Supernatural / paranormal
Cosmic (Lovecraftian)
Ghost story
Monster literature
Jiangshi fiction
Vampire fiction
Werewolf fiction
Occult detective
Science fiction
Alien invasion
Post-apocalyptic
Cyberpunk derivatives
Cyberpunk
Biopunk
Nanopunk
Postcyberpunk
Steampunk
Atompunk
Clockpunk
Dieselpunk
Solarpunk, aka Hopepunk
Dystopian
Hard science fiction
Military science fiction
Parallel universe, aka alternative universe
Alternative history
LitRPG
Scientific romance
Social science fiction
Soft science fiction
Space opera
portal fantasy aka Isekai and Accidental travel
Speculative cross-genre fiction
Bizarro fiction
Climate fiction (cli-fi)
Dying Earth
Science fantasy
Planetary romance
Sword and planet
Slipstream
Weird fiction 
New Weird 

Suspense fiction
Crime fiction
Detective fiction
Gong'an fiction
Mystery fiction
Thriller
Mystery fiction
Legal thriller
Medical thriller
Political thriller
Spy fiction
Psychological thriller
Techno-thriller
Tragedy
Melodrama
Urban fiction
Westerns
Women's fiction
Chick lit
Class S
Femslash
Matron literature
Romance novel
Yaoi
Yuri
Workplace tell-all
General cross-genre
Historical romance
Juvenile fantasy
LGBT pulp fiction
Gay male pulp fiction
Lesbian pulp fiction
Lesbian erotica fiction
Paranormal romance
Romantic fantasy
Tragicomedy

Other nonfiction genres
These are genres belonging to the realm of nonfiction. Some genres listed may reappear throughout the list, indicating cross-genre status.

Biography
Memoir
Autobiography
Slave narrative
Spiritual autobiography
Bildungsroman
Contemporary slave narrative
Neo-slave narrative
Commentary
Creative nonfiction
Critique
Canonical criticism
Form criticism
Higher criticism
Historical criticism
Lower criticism
Narrative criticism
Postmodern criticism
Psychological criticism
Redaction criticism
Rhetorical criticism
Social criticism
Source criticism
Textual criticism
Cult literature
Diaries and journals
Didactic
Dialectic
Rabbinic
Aporetic
Elenctic
Erotic literature
Essay, treatise
History
Academic history
Genealogy
Narrative
People's history
Popular history
Official history
Narrative history

Whig history
Lament
Law
Ceremonial
Family
Levitical
Moral
Natural
Royal decree
Social
Letter
Manuscript
Philosophy
Metaphysics
Socratic dialogue
Poetry
Religious text
Apocalyptic
Apologetics

Chant
Confession
Covenant
Creed
Daily devotional
Epistle
Pauline epistle
General epistle
Encyclical
Gospel
Homily
Koan
Lectionary
Liturgy
Mysticism
Occult literature
Prayer
Philosophy
Philosophical theology
Philosophy of religion
Religious epistemology
Prophecy
Blessing/Curse
Messianic prophecy
Divination
Oracle
Woe oracle
Prediction
Vision
Revelation
Natural revelation
Special revelation
Scripture
Buddhist texts
Lotus Sutra
Tripitaka
Christian literature
Apocrypha
Christian devotional literature
Christian tragedy
Encyclical
New Testament
Old Testament
Patristic
Anti-Nicene
Post-Nicene
Psalms
Imprecatory psalm
Pseudepigrapha
Hindu literature
Bhagavad Gita
Vedas
Islamic literature
Haddith
Quran
Jewish literature
Hebrew poetry
Song
Dirge
Hymn
Sutra
Theology
Apologetics
Biblical theology
Cosmology
Christology
Ecclesiology
Eschatology
Hamartiology
Pneumatology
Mariology
Natural theology
Soteriology
Theology proper
Wisdom literature
Scientific writing
Testament
True crime

References

Genres

Genres